The One is a supertall skyscraper currently under construction in Toronto, Ontario, Canada. When completed, it will be the tallest building in Canada. At 338 metres (1,109 feet) and 94 storeys, it will be taller than First Canadian Place, which has been Canada's tallest building since 1976. It will also be Canada's first supertall (> 300 m) skyscraper, as defined by the Council on Tall Buildings and Urban Habitat. Construction of the building is expected to be completed by 2024.

Located in Toronto's Yorkville neighbourhood at the intersection of Yonge and Bloor, The One is across the street from the  One Bloor condominium building. It will also stand next to Two Bloor West, an existing skyscraper completed in 1972. The site of The One involved land assembly that includes properties at 768 Yonge Street, in addition to those at 1 and 11 Bloor Street West. 

Developer Sam Mizrahi acquired the land in October 2014 for  million. Mizrahi received approval from the city to build on September 12, 2016. The total cost for the project is reported to be $1 billion.

Design
Mizrahi hired the London-based Foster and Partners as the design architect, and Core Architects as the local architect. He travelled to London to design the building using an exoskeleton structure.  The design of the building was revised based on recommendations from RWDI and the organization's wind tunnel testing. The final design no longer features a structural exoskeleton; however, it retains diagonal hangers which maintain a triangulated appearance. The structural engineer of record for the project is RJC Engineers. The extra height of the building has been determined to not have increased shadowing impacts on nearby parks.

Retail and hotel
The first 18 storeys of The One will include restaurants, event spaces, two major retailers and a luxury Hyatt hotel created under its boutique Andaz brand. The 160-room Andaz Toronto will occupy the fourth to sixteenth floors of the building, with the lobby on the fourth floor and an outdoor pool deck on the sixth floor.

Set to replace Stollerys as the podium tenant was Toronto’s new Apple Store with approximately 19,000 square feet of ground floor retail space, superseding Apple’s current store at the Eaton Centre. In March 2022, Apple launched a lawsuit to terminate its lease agreement with Mizrahi Developments, and claimed $6.9 million in delay damages, expressing "profound disappointment" with The One's developers in regards to missed deadlines; Mizrahi has countersued, arguing that it has not missed deadlines and Apple does not have the option to get out and that the delays were caused by factors outside of the developer's control, such as a provincewide plumber and pipefitter strike in 2019, and COVID-19.  The One’s designer Foster and Partners also designed Apple’s stores in Chicago, Miami, Hong Kong and Macau. According to photographer Pedro Marques, the store was to feature a three story vaulted ceiling with a cantilevered mezzanine over the main floor, a build which was complicated by Apple’s requirements that there be no interior columns, and was to be fronted by three-story glass panels. Manufactured in Gersthofen, Germany, each glass panel measures over 2.3 meters wide , 11.5 meters high and 10.9 centimeters thick, with eight sheets of laminated glass. The retail portion of the tower was scheduled to open in 2021.

Residential
Above the retail outlet, the tower's residential section will have a total of 416 units. The One will include four penthouse units. Four storeys of parking will exist underground, and the building will connect to the Bloor–Yonge station and nearby buildings via an underground walkway system similar to (but separate from) the city's PATH system.

Acquiring the property 

For 114 years, One Bloor West, where The One will be built, was the location of Stollerys, a men's and women's fine clothing store founded by president Ed Whaley and owned by his family.  Other developers had interest in buying and developing One Bloor West.  However, Mizrahi met with Whaley regularly and the two developed a friendship around shared values.  Whaley called Mizrahi a "gentleman" and someone who "builds a quality building". After Mizrahi purchased the properties for The One, Mizrahi provided a written promise to Whaley that a monument, built from the stones of Stollerys, would be developed at the site of The One.
 
On January 7, 2015, Mizrahi applied for a demolition permit of the Stollerys building. Six days later, local Councillor Kristyn Wong-Tam put forward a motion at the Toronto and East York Community Council in order to designate the building as a heritage site. However, Mizrahi was granted the demolition permit on January 16, and in order to prevent the heritage designation, started to demolish the building on the weekend starting Saturday, January 17. These actions angered many in the heritage groups and prompted calls for new processes for heritage and demolition in the city of Toronto.

Progress

In June 2016, the city of Toronto’s planning staff gave a positive report on plans for The One’s development, including in their report a number of community benefit recommendations.  The report found that plans for The One met Toronto’s planning policies and guidelines.  On April 18, 2017, the project was approved by the Ontario Municipal Board (OMB). With approval both by the OMB and by Toronto's city council, pre-construction as well as pre-sales of The One's units began.  As of spring 2017, more than 3,000 people had pre-registered for the 416 residential units.

In August 2017, The One secured its new round of lending replacing existing debt, with Firm Capital Corp. lending  million ( million) as a first mortgage on The One.  In November 2017, The One's presentation centre opened for the first time for people who pre-registered.

On August 23, 2017, construction of The One officially broke ground, with excavation nearly complete as of October 2018.  In November 2018, a special crane, the Link-Belt TG2300B, described by a source as potentially the highest capacity crane deployed in Toronto, was brought to the site to begin construction of the tower.  The creation of 32 mega caissons, which will be used to support the tower, was completed in April 2019.  On May 1, 2019, it was announced that The One will include a 160-room Andaz hotel, expected to open in 2022. 

In September 2019, The One secured a new round of financing, with Korean fund IGIS Asset Management Co. Ltd. lending  million ( million) to the project. In October 2019, a mock-up was installed to physically illustrate The One's brushed aluminum and glazing cladding.

In December 2019, construction halted on the building, with the City of Toronto issuing a "stop-work order" on the site. On August 31, 2020, the building was issued a conditional above-grade permit by the City of Toronto, allowing for above-grade construction of the building to begin.  Work on the second floor began in December 2020 with the laying of floor forms and assembly of rebar. Construction of the surrounding podium structure has also started.  In January 2021, Mizrahi Developments applied through an addendum for a height increase for The One. If approved by the city of Toronto, The One will be 94 storeys tall with a planned height of 338.3 metres, which would make The One the tallest tower currently planned in Canada.

See also
 List of tallest buildings in Canada
 Mirvish+Gehry

References

External links
 
 UrbanToronto database
 BuzzBuzz home database

Buildings and structures under construction in Canada
Residential skyscrapers in Toronto
Foster and Partners buildings